Captain First Class Fuad Yusubov was the Commander of Azerbaijani Naval Forces. He was replaced in 1999 by Vice Admiral Shahin Sultanov.

See also
Azerbaijani Army
Ministers of Defense of Azerbaijan Republic
General Staff of Azerbaijani Armed Forces

References

Chiefs of General Staff of Azerbaijani Armed Forces
Living people
1951 births
Azerbaijani Navy personnel